Government Junta of Chile (December 16, 1811), was the political structure established to rule Chile following a Military Coup organized by José Miguel Carrera. It lasted until replaced by the Superior Governmental Junta.

See also
History of Chile
List of Government Juntas of Chile

External links
La Aurora de Chile, First Chilean Newspaper (1812) online. 

Government of Chile